Wet'n'Wild is a brand used for many water parks across the world owned by Village Roadshow Theme Parks and EPR Properties. It is not to be confused with the Wet 'n Wild brand originally owned by SeaWorld creator George Millay or Wet N' Wild Waterworld, a stand-alone water park in Anthony, Texas.

History
The Wet'n'Wild brand originates from Wet'n'Wild Water World on the Gold Coast, Australia. It first opened in 1984 as Cade's County Waterpark, before being renamed to Wet'n'Wild in 1987 after a licensing agreement was reached with chain of Wet 'n Wild water parks overseas.

In 2008, Village Roadshow Theme Parks, the owners of Wet'n'Wild Water World, began to explore opportunities to expand the brand. One proposal was to acquire Aussie World and redevelop it into Wet'n'Wild Aussie World; however, these plans were cancelled. Internationally the company acquired the Hawaiian Waters Adventure Park in the United States. The park was rebranded to Wet'n'Wild Hawaii the following year. The company also purchased WaterWorld Safari, investing $30 million in the park relaunched as Wet'n'Wild Phoenix. Village Roadshow's ownership of Wet'n'Wild Hawaii was short-lived, as the park was sold to CNL Lifestyle Properties for an undisclosed sum in 2009. Village Roadshow Theme Parks, however, continued to operate the park.

In 2013, new Wet'n'Wild water parks were built by Village Roadshow Theme Parks in Las Vegas and Sydney.

In November 2013, CNL Lifestyle Properties purchased Wet'n'Wild Phoenix, with Premier Parks, LLC taking over operations of both Wet'n'Wild Phoenix and Wet'n'Wild Hawaii for the 2014 season. In addition, CNL Lifestyle Properties also purchased the rights to the Wet'n'Wild brand in the United States. Village Roadshow Theme Parks continued to operate and hold a majority stake in ownership of Wet'n'Wild Las Vegas. CNL Lifestyle Properties' ownership of the Wet'n'Wild brand in the United States led them to branding their recently acquired California water park as Wet'n'Wild Palm Springs, and their SplashTown Houston park as Wet'n'Wild SplashTown.

In 2018, the first Chinese Wet'n'Wild water park opened. It is owned by Guangzhou R&F Properties and operated by Village Roadshow Theme Parks.

In 2016, Premier Parks purchased Wild Water Kingdom in Brampton, Ontario, Canada and renamed it Wet'n'Wild Toronto. It was formerly independent.

In July 2018, Parques Reunidos purchased Wet'n'Wild Sydney from Village Roadshow Theme Parks, and later renamed the park Raging Waters Sydney.

Locations

 Wet'n'Wild Gold Coast
 Wet'n'Wild Haikou
 Wet'n'Wild Hawaii
 Wet'n'Wild Toronto

Previous locations
 Wet'n'Wild Phoenix
 Wet'n'Wild SplashTown
 Wet'n'Wild Las Vegas
 Wet'n'Wild Palm Springs
 Wet'n'Wild Sydney

References

External links
 Wet'n'Wild Gold Coast
 Wet'n'Wild Hawaii
 Wet'n'Wild Las Vegas
 Wet'n'Wild Palm Springs
 Wet'n'Wild Sydney

American brands
Australian brands
Village Roadshow Theme Parks